This is a list of finalists for the 2016 Archibald Prize for portraiture. As the images are copyrighted, an external link to an image has been listed where available (listed is Artist – Title).
Abdul Abdullah – The cost  (Portrait of Craig Campbell)
Clara Adolphs – Terry Serio
Benjamin Aitken – Portrait of mentor (Jon Cattapan and self) 
Tony Albert – Tony Albert (after Brownie Downing)  (Self-portrait)
Danelle Bergstrom – Guy Warren  
Kate Beynon – Claudia, Spartacus and the robots  
Natasha Bieniek – Wendy Whiteley  
Chris Bond – The restless dead (portrait of the artist)  (Self-portrait)
 Dean Brown – McLean Edwards 
 Chris Browne –  Krista Brennan  
Daniel Butterworth –  Annie Smithers  
Yvette Coppersmith –  Rose Burn self-portrait  
Lucy Culliton –  Lucy and fans  (Self-portrait)
Sinead Davies –  Toni Zeltzer  
Camillo De Luca –  Polymath  (Portrait of Josh Frydenberg)
Marc Etherington – King Ken (Ken Done in his studio)  
David Fairbairn – Large head JL no 3  (Portrait of John Lascelles)
Betina Fauvel-Ogden –  George Calombaris, masterchef  (Winner of the Packing Room Prize 2016) (Image)
Carla Fletcher – Twin souls, Linda Jackson 
Prudence Flint – Shower  (Portrait of Athena Bellas)
Juan Ford – Regaining sight (a meditation on Rose Soady)  (Self-portrait)
 David Griggs – It's a G thang  (Portrait of Max Francois Germanos)
Guan Wei – Plastic surgery (Self-portrait)
Tsering Hannaford – Self-portrait with magnolia  
Nicholas Harding –  Peter Weiss AO  
Louise Hearman –  Barry  (Portrait of Barry Humphries) (Winner of the Archibald Prize 2016) (Image)
Belynda Henry – Louise Olsen, a beautiful summary  
Mark Horton – Troy (Portrait of Troy Grant)
 Alan Jones –  Pat  (Portrait of Pat Corrigan)
Guy Maestri – Shattered (Griggs)  (Portrait of David Griggs)
Dean Manning – Maximum Lawrence  (Portrait of Lawrence Leung)
Marie Mansfield – Study of Euan Macleod 
India Mark –  Day at the gallery with Dane Taylor  
Michael McWilliams –  The usurpers (self-portrait)  
Lewis Miller – Portrait of Bernie Teague  
Nick Mourtzakis –  Self-portrait: in violet  
Kirsty Neilson –  There's no humour in darkness  (Portrait of Garry McDonald)
William Rhodes – Alice  
Melissa Ritchie – Rhys smart mouth  (Portrait of Rhys Nicholson)
Monica Rohan – Easton Pearson  (Portrait of Pamela Easton and Lydia Pearson)
Sally Ross – Roslyn  (Portrait of Roslyn Oxley)
Marikit Santiago – Blacklustre  (Portrait of Ramesh Mario Nithiyendran)
Nick Stathopoulos – Deng  (Portrait of Deng Adut) (Winner of the People's Choice Award 2016) (Image)
Imants Tillers – Double reality (self-portrait) 2014–2016  
Rosemary Valadon – The Scribbler (Luke Sciberras)  
Natasha Walsh – Self-portrait  
Peter Wegner – John Wolseley  
Mirra Whale – Philip Nitschke 
Marcus Wills – The ersatz (James Batchelor)  
Heidi Yardley – Birth/death – portrait of Nell  
Zoe Young – Sam Harris  (Portrait of Samantha Harris)

See also 
Previous year: List of Archibald Prize 2015 finalists
Next year: List of Archibald Prize 2017 finalists
List of Archibald Prize winners

External links
Archibald Prize 2016 finalists, official website, Art Gallery of NSW
Archibald Prize 2016 finalists, 15 June 2016, abc.net.au

2016
Archibald
Archibald
Archibald Prize 2016
Archibald Prize 2016
2016 awards in Australia